The second round of the women's scratch race of the 2008–2009 UCI Track Cycling World Cup Classics took place in Melbourne, Australia on 20 November 2008. 36 athletes participated in the contest.

Competition format
A scratch race is a race in which all riders start together and the object is simply to be first over the finish line after a certain number of laps. There are no intermediate points or sprints.

The tournament consisted of two qualifying heats of 7.5 km (30 laps). The top twelve cyclist of each heat advanced to the 10 km final (40 laps).

Schedule
Thursday 20 November
17:00-17:20 Qualifying
20:45-21:05 Final
21:30-21:35 Victory Ceremony

Schedule from Tissottiming.com

Results

Qualifying

Qualifying Heat 1

Results from Tissottiming.com.

Qualifying Heat 2

Results from Tissottiming.com.

Final

Results from Tissottiming.com.

See also
 2008–2009 UCI Track Cycling World Cup Classics – Round 2 – Women's individual pursuit
 2008–2009 UCI Track Cycling World Cup Classics – Round 2 – Women's points race

References

UCI Track Cycling World Cup Classics Round 2 Womens scratch
UCI Track Cycling World Cup Classics Round 2 Womens scratch
UCI Track Cycling World Cup – Women's scratch